Olszewka may refer to the following places:
Olszewka, Nakło County in Kuyavian-Pomeranian Voivodeship (north-central Poland)
Olszewka, Ciechanów County in Masovian Voivodeship (east-central Poland)
Olszewka, Ostrołęka County in Masovian Voivodeship (east-central Poland)
Olszewka, Przasnysz County in Masovian Voivodeship (east-central Poland)